Stephen Wellington (4 July 1899 – 11 June 1974) was an Australian cricketer. He played one first-class match for Tasmania in 1928/29.

See also
 List of Tasmanian representative cricketers

References

External links
 

1899 births
1974 deaths
Australian cricketers
Tasmania cricketers
Cricketers from Tasmania